Fořt is a Czech surname, which meant forester, created from German Forst. Notable people with the surname include: 

Pavel Fořt
Radovan Fořt
Stanislav Fořt

Czech-language surnames